Catherine Crowston  (born November 20, 1963) is the executive director and chief curator of the Art Gallery of Alberta. Crowston was previously the director of the Walter Phillips Gallery at The Banff Centre and the curator of the Edmonton Art Gallery. She was awarded the Medal for Outstanding Achievement by the Royal Canadian Academy of Arts in 2002.

References

Living people
Canadian art curators
1963 births
Canadian women curators
Members of the Royal Canadian Academy of Arts